Gregg De Lorto (born October 12, 1950) is an American guitarist, singer-songwriter, arranger, record producer and the California representative for The Heritage Guitar Company of Kalamazoo – Heritage Guitars. He is a native of California and the great-grandson of two Italian-born musicians and old world luthiers (violin makers). Without knowledge of his musical roots, De Lorto began playing the guitar at the age of nine, showcasing his talent performing at schools and local venues, all the while increasing his musical range. By 14, he had become a professional musician when he joined Limey and The Yanks.

The following year, he auditioned for the popular ABC Paramount recording group The Spats.  From the moment the audition started he stood out from the others with his Gretsch Country Gentleman and by the fact he flawlessly played pop music, Motown, The Rolling Stones, and anything else they performed.  Despite the fact that De Lorto was a plug-in and play musician, they wanted someone older.  The Spats had a gig scheduled for the Saturday after the auditions and told De Lorto if he wanted to play with them while they continued to look for someone older they would outfit him with clothes and spats.  After a fitting for the trademark attire, a trip to Knott's Berry Farm to pick up a pair of grey utility spats, rehearsals with the band, and live performances, he proved that not only he had the chops, but also that playing up to four-hour sets without repeating a song by a multitude of artists and sounds was second nature.  Within two weeks Buddy Johnson, the leader of the band, told De Lorto the search was over and he officially was in, but he should "try to look older."

Since George Harrison was one of his heroes, by the time De Lorto joined The Spats he had already mastered The Beatles’ songs.  With the Johnson brothers’ vocal range equal to that of the Fab Four, and De Lorto not only knowing The Beatles music note-for-note, but he played the same Gretsch guitar as his hero and The Spats easily added the sounds of the British Invasion as well as The Rascals, Vanilla Fudge, Santana, The Doors and other styles to their roster.  After that, his focus unexpectedly turned to jazz when he first heard Wes Montgomery’s "Bump’n On Sunset."

Over the years, De Lorto followed his passion, including continually honing the styles of the guitar greats: B.B. King, Eric Clapton, Kenny Burrell, Wes Montgomery, Charlie Christian and others. By 1980, he became a respected representative for Gibson Guitar Corporation, and then in 1985 for The Heritage Guitar Company of Kalamazoo. As his ancestors before him, playing was not enough, he had to learn and know intimately each and every aspect of the instruments he played, which led him to becoming an expert on the construction and history of the guitar.  Today, he shares that knowledge by holding clinics on The History of the Carve Top Jazz Guitar and The Heritage Guitar Company of Kalamazoo throughout California.

After losing his voice in 1995, De Lorto had surgery to remove nodules on his vocal cords.  In 2007, he was diagnosed with an inoperable midbrain tumor.  Feeling his time was not over and not ready to give up, he sought the best and was referred to neurosurgeon Mark E. Linskey, M.D., at UC Irvine Medical Center.

During their first meeting De Lorto told Dr. Linskey he was concerned about how the operation would affect his right and left hand coordination.  Dr. Linskey said "this is not a textbook surgery…," but not to worry and that he wanted to see him playing his guitar at his one year post-op appointment.  Three weeks after their first meeting Dr. Linskey successfully excised the tumor followed by a two-week medically induced coma.

Soon after waking from the coma, and not able to eat or walk on his own, from his recovery bed, he was composing in his head his "Ode to Charlie Christian" – a complex arrangement.  At his one year post-op appointment he walked in with his Heritage Golden Eagle and amazed Dr. Linskey and his staff by playing a compilation of Charlie Christian licks and lines consisting of single string and chord melody, his "Ode to Charlie Christian."

With a positive post-op exam there was hope the worse was over.  Then the tragic diagnosis that Gregg's wife for more than 30 years, classically trained pianist Paulette Froemming De Lorto (1943–2009), was in the fourth stage of cancer.  She died the following year.

Life would take another surprising turn when business for The Heritage Guitar Company took him 400 miles away and face-to-face with a platonic friend from nearly forty years earlier; that meeting lead to a new marriage and the genesis for unexpected compositions and new recordings.
    
In 2013, De Lorto released a CD of original biographical love songs, with many more original songs in production.  De Lorto uses multiple guitars on each song, very much the way painter uses brushes – each for its own unique qualities – as he incorporates the lines, styles and techniques of the greatest guitarists of all time. His unique brand of music celebrates the love, romance, commitment and dedication inspired by the love of his life.

Internationally acclaimed guitarist, educator and author Wolf Marshall, sums up the song "Serenade Me in the Moonlight", "Serenade is a wonderful tribute in sound and lyrical imagery.... It feels like an ending and a beginning at the same time."

Song titles 
Serenade Me in the Moonlight released August 1, 2013 under the label De Lorto Music."

Serenade Me in the Moonlight
Inspired by the question, "will you serenade me in the moonlight on our honeymoon?" – is a multifaceted and multi-genre serenade with a modern Spanish-Latin-jazzy feel that features a solo voice with background support and the voice of the Lady in the Moonlight (Jasmine Lee). The song crescendos into the chorus theme and culminates with celebrating la la la's and angelic voice with a hot Flamenco guitar solo cool down fading into the moonlight. De Lorto uses two nylon Spanish classical guitars, and two Heritage Custom Golden Eagles to create a wide range of guitar orchestration and styles with intricate guitar passages, counter-melody along with full strings, brass, percussion and bass.

Déjà Vu I'm With You
Reminiscent of the iconic music of the 1960s, tells the story of an innocent friendship that takes the surprising turn to love decades later. With a firm foundation and sparkly Benson-ish solos, De Lorto summons the Hammond B-3 as the driving force for the sound, along with solid rhythm guitars. He plays all the guitar solos and fills on his Heritage Custom Thin Golden Eagle, and the groove-setting rhythm on his Heritage Split Block Golden Eagle.

Can You Imagine A Love Like This
The heart-stirring vocals are sung by Victoria Rohrig Marchi, while nylon classic guitars are featured in both background and solos, the Heritage Super Eagle shines with vibrant splashes of Wes throughout.  Whether the vocal or instrumental arrangement, this is a romantic ballroom dance.

The Rose of Sharon, My Jewell and Always Will Be
A personal expression of love using haunting strings, exotic rhythms, and a captivating melody in both the vocal and instrumental arrangements. This song is enchanting, spiritual, seductive and sexy, and features musically-sound, multi-guitar tracks, played with two nylons, two Heritage Golden Eagles, and a Heritage Super Eagle soloing a very Wes tribute.

References

External links

Official website
Heritage Guitar website
Gregg De Lorto Interview NAMM Oral History Library (2017)

1950 births
Living people
American singer-songwriters
American male singer-songwriters
American pop guitarists
20th-century American guitarists
20th-century American male singers
20th-century American singers